The inaugural series of the ITV1 television series Benidorm, which is a sitcom set in an all-inclusive holiday resort (The Solana) in Benidorm, Spain, began broadcasting on 1 February 2007, consisting of six episodes. The entire series was directed by Kevin Allen and written by Derren Litten. The first series introduced the Garvey family, consisting of Mick (Steve Pemberton), Janice (Siobhan Finneran), Chantelle (Hannah Hobley), Michael (Oliver Stokes) and Janice's mother Madge Barron (Sheila Reid); swingers Donald (Kenny Ireland) and Jacqueline Stewart (Janine Duvitski); mother and son Noreen (Elsie Kelly) and Geoff "The Oracle" Maltby (Johnny Vegas); homosexual couple Gavin (Hugh Sachs) and Troy Ramsbottom (Paul Bazely); un-keen couple Kate (Abigail Cruttenden) and Martin Weedon (Nicholas Burns); and Solana staff Mateo Castellanos (Jake Canuso) and manageress Janey York (Crissy Rock).

Overall, the series received an average viewership of 4.43 million, with the opening episode receiving 5.86 million viewers. The series concluded on 8 March, with the series finale attracting 4.13 million. The first series was heavily praised, resulting in it being recommissioned for a second series, which was broadcast between March and May 2008.

Cast 
 Abigail Cruttenden as Kate Weedon
 Nicholas Burns as Martin Weedon
 Elsie Kelly as Noreen Maltby
 Johnny Vegas as Geoff Maltby
 Steve Pemberton as Mick Garvey
 Siobhan Finneran as Janice Garvey
 Sheila Reid as Madge Harvey
 Oliver Stokes as Michael Garvey
 Hannah Hobley as Chantelle Garvey
 Kenny Ireland as Donald Stewart
 Janine Duvitski as Jacqueline Stewart 
 Hugh Sachs as Gavin Ramsbottom
 Paul Bazely as Troy Ramsbottom
 Jake Canuso as Mateo Castellanos
 Crissy Rock as Janey York

Episodes

Ratings

References

External links 
 

Benidorm (TV series)
2007 British television seasons